Darwinism, Design and Public Education is a 2003 anthology, consisting largely of rewritten versions of essays from a 1998 issue of Michigan State University Press's journal, Rhetoric and Public Affairs, edited by intelligent design activists John Angus Campbell (who serves on the journal's editorial board) and Stephen C. Meyer, neither of whom are scientists.   The book is promoted as being a "peer-reviewed science book", however in reviewing it Barbara Forrest notes that:

The book purports to address the question of "[s]hould public school science teachers be free to teach the controversies over biological origins" and promotes the Discovery Institute's "teach the controversy" political action plan, whilst claiming "not to advocate the theory of ID." This denial is later undercut by claiming that an understanding of ID is needed "to understand Darwin's argument, to say nothing of the contemporary controversy that it continues to generate".

Representation of intelligent design 

In his introduction, Campbell states:

Forrest rebuts these three assertions by pointing out that:

Peer review 

The Discovery Institute lists five chapters as "Peer-Reviewed & Peer-Edited Scientific Publications Supporting the Theory of Intelligent Design, although Mark Isaak of the talk.origins Archive notes that "Anthologies and conference proceedings do not have well-defined peer review standards" and that "reviewers are themselves ardent supporters of intelligent design. The purpose of peer review is to expose errors, weaknesses, and significant omissions in fact and argument. That purpose is not served if the reviewers are uncritical".  The five papers are:
 DNA and the origin of life, Information, specification and explanation Stephen C. Meyer
 Design in the details: The origin of biomolecular machines, Michael Behe
 Reinstating design within science, William Dembski
 Homology in biology: Problem for naturalistic science and prospect for intelligent design Paul Nelson (creationist) and Jonathan Wells
 The Cambrian explosion: biology’s big bang, Stephen C. Meyer, Marcus Ross, Paul Nelson, & Paul Chien

The first three are actually listed twice including once as "featured articles".  Meyer's paper on the Cambrian explosion also contains much of the same material which went into another of the claimed peer-reviewed papers which was at the center of the Sternberg peer review controversy.

See also
List of works on intelligent design

References

External links 
 Publicity website for Darwinism, Design and Public Education
 Michigan State University Press page

2003 non-fiction books
Books by Stephen C. Meyer
English-language books
Intelligent design books